Airpink is a private business jet charter airline based in Belgrade, Serbia. It was founded in October 2004 as part of Pink Media Group, owned by Željko Mitrović. Its main base is Belgrade Nikola Tesla Airport.

Destinations
Airpink provides executive/VIP air charter and corporate jet services to destinations in Europe, Middle East and North Africa.

Fleet

See also
 List of airlines in Serbia

References

External links
 Official website

Airlines of Serbia
Airlines established in 2004
Companies based in Belgrade
Serbian companies established in 2004